Robert Coleman Frame (born October 5, 2002) is an American soccer player who currently plays for North Carolina FC in USL League One.

Playing career

Youth
Frame played as part of the North Carolina FC academy from 2016. On March 24, 2021, Frame signed an academy contract with the club's senior team who compete in the USL League One. He made his debut on May 8, 2021, appearing as an 81st-minute substitute during a 2–1 loss to Greenville Triumph. His first goal came on June 20, 2021 vs. Chattanooga Red Wolves SC.

References 

2002 births
American soccer players
Association football forwards
Living people
North Carolina FC players
North Carolina FC U23 players
People from Wake Forest, North Carolina
Soccer players from North Carolina
USL League One players
USL League Two players